Catherine Anne Taber (born December 30, 1979) is an American actress. She is known for voicing Padmé Amidala in Star Wars: The Clone Wars and Lori Loud and Katherine Mulligan on The Loud House.

Biography

In 2000, Taber made her feature film debut starring alongside Soleil Moon Frye and Wil Wheaton in the coming of age dramedy The Girls' Room, where she and Frye play college roommates with contrasting lifestyles.

Taber got her break into video game voice-overs in Star Wars: Knights of the Old Republic in 2003, where she played Mission Vao. She voiced Penelo in Final Fantasy XII, for which she was nominated for a National Academy of Video Game Trade Reviewers (NAVGTR) Award for Supporting Role in a Drama in 2006.

She was the voice of Padmé Amidala in the Star Wars: The Clone Wars animated film and television series that aired on Cartoon Network from 2008 to 2014. Although she auditioned for the part, she credits her video game roles in the Star Wars universe as helping her become a fan and landing the part. She also voiced Amidala in the related Star Wars video games, as well as the character Vette in Star Wars: The Old Republic. She voiced Princess Leia in the Star Wars: Force Unleashed video games, and provided voices during production of the now cancelled animated comedy series Star Wars Detours. Meanwhile, in live-action roles, she had a starring role in the horror movie The Morningside Monster which screened at the Phoenix Film Festival in April 2014.

Outside of science fiction films and video games, she voiced Ginger the Pig in A Pig's Tail, an animated 2012 short film made by Aardman Animations for The Humane Society. She also runs a charity website called Games for Soldiers where she collects video game donations for U.S. soldiers overseas.

In 2016, Taber provided voice work on Nickelodeon's The Loud House, where she voices such characters as Lori Loud, Katherine Mulligan, Girl Jordan. 

Taber also voiced female Jesse in both seasons of the video game Minecraft: Story Mode (2015–17), which was first released by Telltale Games on October 12, 2015.

In 2021, Taber reprised her role as Katherine Mulligan from The Loud House in the live-action film A Loud House Christmas.

Filmography

Animation

Television series

Film

Video games

Audiobooks
 Gods in Alabama (2005)
 Star Wars: Empire & Rebellion: Razor's Edge (2013)
 Gray Mountain (2014)
 Star Wars: Queen's Shadow (2019)
Star Wars: Queen’s Peril (2020)
 Doctor Aphra: An Audiobook Original (2020)
 Star Wars: Queen’s Hope (2022)

Live-action film

References

External links

 
 
 
 

1979 births
Living people
American Christians
American film actresses
American television actresses
American video game actresses
American voice actresses
20th-century American actresses
21st-century American actresses